The 2019–20 Philadelphia 76ers season was the 71st season of the franchise in the National Basketball Association (NBA).

The season was suspended by league officials following the games of March 11 after it was reported that Rudy Gobert tested positive for COVID-19. On March 19, it was announced that three people from team's staff tested positive for COVID-19.

Coach Brett Brown was fired after the 76ers lost in a 4-game sweep to the Boston Celtics.

Draft picks

The 76ers held one first round pick and four second round picks. The 24th and 33rd picks was traded to the Boston Celtics for Matisse Thybulle, while the 34th pick was traded to the Atlanta Hawks for Jordan Bone and two future second-round draft picks. Also, the 42nd pick was traded to the Washington Wizards for cash considerations, along with trading away Jonathon Simmons.

Roster

Standings

Atlantic division

Conference standings

Game log

Preseason

|- style="background:#cfc;"
| 1
| October 8
| Guangzhou
| 
| Ben Simmons (21)
| Tobias Harris (9)
| Ben Simmons (7)
| Wells Fargo Center20,155
| 1–0
|- style="background:#cfc;"
| 2
| October 11
| @ Charlotte
| 
| Josh Richardson (18)
| Al Horford (9)
| Kyle O'Quinn (5)
| Lawrence Joel Veterans Memorial Coliseum10,437
| 2–0
|- style="background:#cfc;"
| 3
| October 13
| @ Orlando
| 
| Joel Embiid (15)
| Joel Embiid (9)
| Kyle O'Quinn (9)
| Amway Center16,819
| 3–0
|- style="background:#cfc;"
| 4
| October 15
| Detroit
| 
| Joel Embiid (24)
| Kyle O'Quinn (11)
| Josh Richardson (6)
| Wells Fargo Center14,317
| 4–0
|- style="background:#fcc;"
| 5
| October 18
| Washington
| 
| Joel Embiid (17)
| Tobias Harris (9)
| Al Horford (5)
| Wells Fargo Center15,347
| 4–1

Regular season

|- style="background:#cfc;"
| 1
| October 23
| Boston
| 
| Ben Simmons (24)
| Tobias Harris (15)
| Ben Simmons (9)
| Wells Fargo Center20,422
| 1–0
|- style="background:#cfc;"
| 2
| October 26
| @ Detroit
| 
| Tobias Harris (29)
| Al Horford (9)
| Ben Simmons (10)
| Little Caesars Arena16,207
| 2–0
|- style="background:#cfc;"
| 3
| October 28
| @ Atlanta
| 
| Joel Embiid (36)
| Joel Embiid (13)
| Ben Simmons (6)
| State Farm Arena14,094
| 3–0
|- style="background:#cfc;"
| 4
| October 30
| Minnesota
| 
| Joel Embiid (19)
| Al Horford (16)
| Ben Simmons (7)
| Wells Fargo Center20,204
| 4–0

|- style="background:#cfc;"
| 5
| November 2
| @ Portland
| 
| Al Horford (25)
| Ben Simmons (11)
| Ben Simmons (8)
| Moda Center19,441
| 5–0
|- style="background:#fcc;"
| 6
| November 4
| @ Phoenix
| 
| Al Horford (32)
| Tobias Harris (10)
| Ben Simmons (6)
| Talking Stick Resort Arena14,285
| 5–1
|- style="background:#fcc;"
| 7
| November 6
| @ Utah
| 
| Joel Embiid (27)
| Joel Embiid (16)
| Neto, Richardson (4)
| Vivint Smart Home Arena18,306
| 5–2
|- style="background:#fcc;"
| 8
| November 8
| @ Denver
| 
| Joel Embiid (19)
| Joel Embiid (15)
| Raul Neto (6)
| Pepsi Center19,520
| 5–3
|- style="background:#cfc;"
| 9
| November 10
| Charlotte
| 
| Joel Embiid (18)
| Joel Embiid (9)
| Josh Richardson (6)
| Wells Fargo Center20,311
| 6–3
|- style="background:#cfc;"
| 10
| November 12
| Cleveland
| 
| Joel Embiid (27)
| Joel Embiid (16)
| Ben Simmons (6)
| Wells Fargo Center20,294
| 7–3
|- style="background:#fcc;"
| 11
| November 13
| @ Orlando
| 
| Josh Richardson (19)
| Tobias Harris (10)
| Tobias Harris (6)
| Amway Center15,113
| 7–4
|- style="background:#fcc;"
| 12
| November 15
| @ Oklahoma City
| 
| Joel Embiid (31)
| Joel Embiid (12)
| Ben Simmons (8)
| Chesapeake Energy Arena18,203
| 7–5
|- style="background:#cfc;"
| 13
| November 17
| @ Cleveland
| 
| Tobias Harris (27)
| Al Horford (6)
| Ben Simmons (11)
| Rocket Mortgage FieldHouse19,432
| 8–5
|- style="background:#cfc;"
| 14
| November 20
| New York
| 
| Joel Embiid (23)
| Joel Embiid (12)
| Ben Simmons (13)
| Wells Fargo Center20,384
| 9–5
|- style="background:#cfc"
| 15
| November 22
| San Antonio
| 
| Tobias Harris (26)
| Joel Embiid (14)
| Ben Simmons (13)
| Wells Fargo Center20,927
| 10–5
|- style="background:#cfc;"
| 16
| November 23
| Miami
| 
| Josh Richardson (32)
| Joel Embiid (11)
| Ben Simmons (7)
| Wells Fargo Center21,017
| 11–5
|- style="background:#fcc;"
| 17
| November 25
| @ Toronto
| 
| Josh Richardson (25)
| Joel Embiid (13)
| Ben Simmons (14)
| Scotiabank Arena19,800
| 11–6
|- style="background:#cfc;"
| 18
| November 27
| Sacramento
| 
| Joel Embiid (33)
| Joel Embiid (16)
| Horford, Simmons (5)
| Wells Fargo Center20,592
| 12–6
|- style="background:#cfc;"
| 19
| November 29
| @ New York
| 
| Joel Embiid (27)
| Joel Embiid (17)
| Ben Simmons (8)
| Madison Square Garden18,109
| 13–6
|- style="background:#cfc;"
| 20
| November 30
| Indiana
| 
| Joel Embiid (32)
| Joel Embiid (11)
| Ben Simmons (13)
| Wells Fargo Center20,517
| 14–6

|- style="background:#cfc;"
| 21
| December 2
| Utah
| 
| Tobias Harris (26)
| Joel Embiid (11)
| Ben Simmons (9)
| Wells Fargo Center20,208
| 15–6
|- style="background:#fcc;"
| 22
| December 5
| @ Washington
| 
| Tobias Harris (33)
| Joel Embiid (21)
| Ben Simmons (10)
| Capital One Arena16,554
| 15–7
|- style="background:#cfc;"
| 23
| December 7
| Cleveland
| 
| Ben Simmons (34)
| Kyle O'Quinn (11)
| Trey Burke (8)
| Wells Fargo Center20,844
| 16–7
|- style="background:#cfc;"
| 24
| December 8
| Toronto
| 
| Tobias Harris (26)
| Ben Simmons (11)
| Ben Simmons (9)
| Wells Fargo Center20,313
| 17–7
|- style="background:#cfc;"
| 25
| December 10
| Denver
| 
| Joel Embiid (22)
| Joel Embiid (10)
| Ben Simmons (7)
| Wells Fargo Center20,591
| 18–7
|- style="background:#cfc;"
| 26
| December 12
| @ Boston
| 
| Joel Embiid (38)
| Joel Embiid (13)
| Tobias Harris (7)
| TD Garden19,156
| 19–7
|- style="background:#cfc;"
| 27
| December 13
| New Orleans
| 
| Tobias Harris (31)
| Joel Embiid (11)
| Ben Simmons (11)
| Wells Fargo Center20,620
| 20–7
|- style="background:#fcc;"
| 28
| December 15
| @ Brooklyn
| 
| Ben Simmons (20)
| Al Horford (9)
| Al Horford (5)
| Barclays Center17,732
| 20–8
|- style="background:#fcc;"
| 29
| December 18
| Miami
| 
| Joel Embiid (22)
| Joel Embiid (19)
| Richardson, Simmons (6)
| Wells Fargo Center20,715
| 20–9
|- style="background:#fcc;"
| 30
| December 20
| Dallas
| 
| Joel Embiid (33)
| Joel Embiid (17)
| Ben Simmons (8)
| Wells Fargo Center20,778
| 20–10
|- style="background:#cfc;"
| 31
| December 21
| Washington
| 
| Embiid, Richardson (21)
| Joel Embiid (13)
| Ben Simmons (11)
| Wells Fargo Center20,529
| 21–10
|- style="background:#cfc;"
| 32
| December 23
| @ Detroit
| 
| Tobias Harris (35)
| Ben Simmons (13)
| Ben Simmons (17)
| Little Caesars Arena16,476
| 22–10
|- style="background:#cfc;"
| 33
| December 25
| Milwaukee
| 
| Joel Embiid (31)
| Joel Embiid (11)
| Ben Simmons (14)
| Wells Fargo Center21,028
| 23–10
|- style="background:#fcc;"
| 34
| December 27
| @ Orlando
| 
| Embiid, Harris (24)
| Embiid, Harris (11)
| Ben Simmons (7)
| Amway Center17,311
| 23–11
|- style="background:#fcc;"
| 35
| December 28
| @ Miami
| 
| Joel Embiid (35)
| Joel Embiid (11)
| Ben Simmons (11)
| American Airlines Arena19,865
| 23–12
|- style="background:#fcc;"
| 36
| December 31
| @ Indiana
| 
| Josh Richardson (20)
| O'Quinn, Simmons (10)
| O'Quinn, Richardson (5)
| Bankers Life Fieldhouse17,923
| 23–13

|- style="background:#fcc;"
| 37
| January 3
| @ Houston
| 
| Ben Simmons (29)
| Ben Simmons (13)
| Ben Simmons (11)
| Toyota Center18,055
| 23–14
|- style="background:#cfc;"
| 38
| January 6
| Oklahoma City
| 
| Josh Richardson (23)
| Ben Simmons (15)
| Embiid, Simmons (8)
| Wells Fargo Center20,561
| 24–14
|- style="background:#cfc;"
| 39
| January 9
| Boston
| 
| Josh Richardson (29)
| Ben Simmons (9)
| Josh Richardson (7)
| Wells Fargo Center20,822
| 25–14
|- style="background:#fcc;"
| 40
| January 11
| @ Dallas
| 
| Tobias Harris (20)
| Tobias Harris (10)
| Ben Simmons (11)
| American Airlines Center20,244
| 25–15
|- style="background:#fcc;"
| 41
| January 13
| @ Indiana
| 
| Ben Simmons (24)
| Ben Simmons (14)
| Al Horford (5)
| Bankers Life Fieldhouse15,257
| 25–16
|- style="background:#cfc;"
| 42
| January 15
| Brooklyn
| 
| Tobias Harris (34)
| Tobias Harris (10)
| Ben Simmons (11)
| Wells Fargo Center20,416
| 26–16
|- style="background:#cfc;"
| 43
| January 17
| Chicago
| 
| Furkan Korkmaz (24)
| Ben Simmons (11)
| Ben Simmons (7)
| Wells Fargo Center20,919
| 27–16
|- style="background:#cfc;"
| 44
| January 18
| @ New York
| 
| Ben Simmons (21)
| Tobias Harris (8)
| Ben Simmons (8)
| Madison Square Garden17,812
| 28–16
|- style="background:#cfc;"
| 45
| January 20
| @ Brooklyn
| 
| Ben Simmons (34)
| Ben Simmons (12)
| Ben Simmons (12)
| Barclays Center16,801
| 29–16
|- style="background:#fcc;"
| 46
| January 22
| @ Toronto
| 
| Tobias Harris (22)
| Horford, Simmons (10)
| Ben Simmons (8)
| Scotiabank Arena19,800
| 29–17
|- style="background:#cfc;"
| 47
| January 25
| L. A. Lakers
| 
| Tobias Harris (29)
| Ben Simmons (10)
| Ben Simmons (8)
| Wells Fargo Center21,109
| 30–17
|- style="background:#cfc;"
| 48
| January 28
| Golden State
| 
| Joel Embiid (24)
| Al Horford (11)
| Al Horford (8)
| Wells Fargo Center20,854
| 31–17
|- style="background:#fcc;"
| 49
| January 30
| @ Atlanta
| 
| Ben Simmons (31)
| Joel Embiid (14)
| Shake Milton (6)
| State Farm Arena15,227
| 31–18

|- style="background:#fcc;"
| 50
| February 1
| @ Boston
| 
| Ben Simmons (23)
| Horford, Simmons (9)
| Ben Simmons (5)
| TD Garden19,156
| 31–19
|- style="background:#fcc;"
| 51
| February 3
| @ Miami
| 
| Joel Embiid (29)
| Joel Embiid (12)
| Ben Simmons (7)
| American Airlines Arena19,725
| 31–20
|- style="background:#fcc;"
| 52
| February 6
| @ Milwaukee
| 
| Tobias Harris (25)
| Ben Simmons (14)
| Ben Simmons (9)
| Fiserv Forum17,928
| 31–21
|- style="background:#cfc;"
| 53
| February 7
| Memphis
| 
| Furkan Korkmaz (34)
| Joel Embiid (10)
| Ben Simmons (10)
| Wells Fargo Center20,779
| 32–21
|- style="background:#cfc;"
| 54
| February 9
| Chicago
| 
| Furkan Korkmaz (31)
| Joel Embiid (12)
| Ben Simmons (10)
| Wells Fargo Center21,018
| 33–21
|- style="background:#cfc;"
| 55
| February 11
| L. A. Clippers
| 
| Embiid, Simmons (26)
| Harris, Simmons (12)
| Ben Simmons (10)
| Wells Fargo Center20,730
| 34–21
|- style="background:#cfc;"
| 56
| February 20
| Brooklyn
| 
| Joel Embiid (39)
| Joel Embiid (16)
| Tobias Harris (6)
| Wells Fargo Center20,806
| 35–21
|- style="background:#fcc;"
| 57
| February 22
| @ Milwaukee
| 
| Embiid, Korkmaz, Milton (17)
| Joel Embiid (11)
| Joel Embiid (4)
| Fiserv Forum18,290
| 35–22
|- style="background:#cfc;"
| 58
| February 24
| Atlanta
| 
| Joel Embiid (49)
| Joel Embiid (14)
| Shake Milton (6)
| Wells Fargo Center20,836
| 36–22
|- style="background:#fcc;"
| 59
| February 26
| @ Cleveland
| 
| Shake Milton (20)
| Josh Richardson (8)
| Al Horford (5)
| Rocket Mortgage FieldHouse16,332
| 36–23
|- style="background:#cfc;"
| 60
| February 27
| New York
| 
| Tobias Harris (34)
| Kyle O'Quinn (10)
| Al Horford (9)
| Wells Fargo Center20,175
| 37–23

|- style="background:#fcc;"
| 61
| March 1
| @ L. A. Clippers
| 
| Shake Milton (39)
| Al Horford (8)
| Al Horford (6)
| Staples Center19,068
| 37–24
|- style="background:#fcc;"
| 62
| March 3
| @ L. A. Lakers
| 
| Glenn Robinson III (25)
| Al Horford (11)
| Shake Milton (6)
| Staples Center18,997
| 37–25
|- style="background:#cfc;"
| 63
| March 5
| @ Sacramento
| 
| Tobias Harris (28)
| Tobias Harris (14)
| Al Horford (6)
| Golden 1 Center15,485
| 38–25
|- style="background:#fcc;"
| 64
| March 7
| @ Golden State
| 
| Tobias Harris (24)
| Horford, Scott (10)
| Al Horford (7)
| Chase Center18,064
| 38–26
|- style="background:#cfc;"
| 65
| March 11
| Detroit
| 
| Joel Embiid (30)
| Joel Embiid (14)
| Al Horford (6)
| Wells Fargo Center20,172
| 39–26

|- style="background:#fcc;"
| 66
| August 1
| @ Indiana
| 
| Joel Embiid (41)
| Joel Embiid (21)
| Embiid, Simmons (4)
| Visa Athletic CenterNo In-Person Attendance
| 39–27
|- style="background:#cfc;"
| 67
| August 3
| San Antonio
| 
| Joel Embiid (27)
| Joel Embiid (9)
| Embiid, Simmons (5)
| Visa Athletic CenterNo In-Person Attendance
| 40–27
|- style="background:#cfc;"
| 68
| August 5
| @ Washington
| 
| Joel Embiid (30)
| Joel Embiid (11)
| Al Horford (5)
| The ArenaNo In-Person Attendance
| 41–27
|- style="background:#cfc;"
| 69
| August 7
| Orlando
| 
| Embiid, Harris (23)
| Tobias Harris (15)
| Shake Milton (8)
| HP Field HouseNo In-Person Attendance
| 42–27
|- style="background:#fcc;"
| 70
| August 9
| @ Portland
| 
| Josh Richardson (34) 
| Matisse Thybulle (9)
| Josh Richardson (6)
| Visa Athletic CenterNo In-Person Attendance
| 42–28
|- style="background:#fcc;"
| 71
| August 11
| Phoenix
| 
| Alec Burks (23)
| Kyle O'Quinn (10)
| Kyle O'Quinn (11)
| Visa Athletic CenterNo In-Person Attendance
| 42–29
|- style="background:#fcc;"
| 72
| August 12
| Toronto
| 
| Tobias Harris (22)
| Joel Embiid (9)
| 4 players (5)
| HP Field HouseNo In-Person Attendance
| 42–30
|- style="background:#cfc;"
| 73
| August 14
| @ Houston
| 
| Tobias Harris (18)
| Harris, Scott (7)
| Burks, Neto, O'Quinn (5)
| The ArenaNo In-Person Attendance
| 43–30

|- style="background:#;"
| 66
| March 14
| Indiana
| 
| 
| 
| 
| Wells Fargo Center
| 
|- style="background:#;"
| 67
| March 16
| Washington
| 
| 
| 
| 
| Wells Fargo Center
| 
|- style="background:#;"
| 68
| March 18
| Toronto
| 
| 
| 
| 
| Wells Fargo Center
| 
|- style="background:#;"
| 69
| March 19
| @ Charlotte
| 
| 
| 
| 
| Spectrum Center
| 
|- style="background:#;"
| 70
| March 21
| Atlanta
| 
| 
| 
| 
| Wells Fargo Center
| 
|- style="background:#;"
| 71
| March 24
| @ Minnesota
| 
| 
| 
| 
| Target Center
| 
|- style="background:#;"
| 72
| March 26
| @ Chicago
| 
| 
| 
| 
| United Center
| 
|- style="background:#;"
| 73
| March 27
| Phoenix
| 
| 
| 
| 
| Wells Fargo Center
| 
|- style="background:#;"
| 74
| March 29
| Portland
| 
| 
| 
| 
| Wells Fargo Center
| 
|- style="background:#;"
| 75
| March 31
| Houston
| 
| 
| 
| 
| Wells Fargo Center
| 
|- style="background:#;"
| 76
| April 3
| @ Washington
| 
| 
| 
| 
| Capital One Arena
| 
|- style="background:#;"
| 77
| April 5
| Orlando
| 
| 
| 
| 
| Wells Fargo Center
| 
|- style="background:#;"
| 78
| April 7
| Milwaukee
| 
| 
| 
| 
| Wells Fargo Center
| 
|- style="background:#;"
| 79
| April 10
| @ San Antonio
| 
| 
| 
| 
| AT&T Center
| 
|- style="background:#;"
| 80
| April 11
| @ New Orleans
| 
| 
| 
| 
| Smoothie King Center
| 
|- style="background:#;"
| 81
| April 13
| @ Memphis
| 
| 
| 
| 
| FedExForum
| 
|- style="background:#;"
| 82
| April 15
| Charlotte
| 
| 
| 
| 
| Wells Fargo Center
|

Playoffs

|- style="background:#fcc;"
| 1
| August 17
| @ Boston
| 
| Joel Embiid (26)
| Joel Embiid (16)
| Tobias Harris (8)
| HP Field HouseNo in-person attendance
| 0–1
|- style="background:#fcc;"
| 2
| August 19
| @ Boston
| 
| Joel Embiid (34)
| Tobias Harris (11)
| Shake Milton (4)
| HP Field HouseNo in-person attendance
| 0–2
|- style="background:#fcc;"
| 3
| August 21
| Boston
| 
| Joel Embiid (30)
| Tobias Harris (15)
| Tobias Harris (4)
| HP Field HouseNo in-person attendance
| 0–3
|- style="background:#fcc;"
| 4
| August 23
| Boston
| 
| Joel Embiid (30)
| Embiid, Horford (10)
| Josh Richardson (5)
| HP Field HouseNo in-person attendance
| 0–4

Transactions

Trades

Free agents

Re-signed

Additions

Subtractions

References

Philadelphia 76ers seasons
Philadelphia 76ers
Philadelphia 76ers
Philadelphia 76ers